(RkReÜAÜG; which is literally, "Cattle marking and beef labeling supervision duties delegation law") was a law of the German state of Mecklenburg-Vorpommern of 1999, repealed in 2013. It dealt with the supervision of the labeling of beef.

The name of the law is a famous example of the virtually unlimited compounding of nouns that is possible in many Germanic languages. German orthography uses "closed" compounds, concatenating nouns to form one long word. This is unlike most English compounds, which are separated using spaces or hyphens.

Strictly speaking, it is made up of two words, because a hyphen at the end of a word is used to show that the word will end in the same way as the following.

Most German laws have a short title consisting of a composite noun.

Words this long are not very common in German. When the law was proposed in the state parliament, the members reacted with laughter and the responsible minister Till Backhaus apologized for the "possibly excessive length".
In 1999, the Association for the German Language nominated  for its Word of the Year award, but it lost to das Millennium, a Latin word that gained in usage at the time, complementing the German word for millennium, Jahrtausend.

In 2003, a decree was established that modified some real estate-related regulations; its name was longer than the above law:  (long title: , GrundVZÜV), roughly Regulation on the delegation of authority concerning land conveyance permissions. At 67 letters, it surpassed the RkReÜAÜG, but was repealed in 2007.

See also
German compounds
Taumatawhakatangi­hangakoauauotamatea­turipukakapikimaunga­horonukupokaiwhen­uakitanatahu

Longest word in English
Scriptio continua

References

External links 

 
Official parliamentary record of the debate (pdf, in German)
A choir singing the word.

2000 in law
Repealed German legislation
State law in Germany
German words and phrases
2000 in Germany
20th century in Mecklenburg-Western Pomerania
Long words